Bradley James Arnsberg (born August 20, 1963) is a Major League Baseball coach and a former pitcher. He has held the role of pitching coach for the Montreal Expos, Florida Marlins, Toronto Blue Jays, and Houston Astros, and is currently with the Arizona Diamondbacks.

Playing career
Arnsberg graduated from high school in Medford, Oregon, and was drafted in the first round of the  draft (ninth overall) out of Merced College. During his playing career, he played for the New York Yankees, Texas Rangers, and the Cleveland Indians. He made his debut on September 6, 1986, at the age of 23. While pitching for the Rangers, he earned the save for Nolan Ryan's 300th career win against the Milwaukee Brewers in Milwaukee on July 31, 1990 (when the Brewers played in the American League). He played the last game of his Major League career on April 23, 1992, and spent the next two seasons on various minor league teams before retiring.

Coaching career
Arnsberg served as pitching coach for the Montreal Expos from 2000 to 2001 and the Florida Marlins in 2002 and 2003, when they won the World Series. After a year in AAA in 2004 with the Syracuse SkyChiefs, he served as the Toronto Blue Jays pitching coach from 2005 to 2009. In 2010, he was hired by the Houston Astros to serve as their pitching coach. He was fired on June 14, 2011. In 2013, Arnsberg was hired by the Arizona Diamondbacks as their rehab coordinator.

Personal life
Arnsberg currently resides in Cave Creek, Arizona, with his wife, Shelley. They have two children, Kyle and Kaden. Kyle graduated with his bachelor's and master's degree from Louisiana Tech University, and currently serves as an assistant coach for the Cincinnati Reds.

References

External links

1963 births
Living people
Baseball players from Seattle
Major League Baseball pitchers
New York Yankees players
Texas Rangers players
Cleveland Indians players
Colorado Springs Sky Sox players
Albany-Colonie Yankees players
Greensboro Hornets players
Columbus Clippers players
Iowa Cubs players
Louisville Redbirds players
Oklahoma City 89ers players
Indianapolis Indians players
Tacoma Tigers players
Merced Blue Devils baseball players
Florida Marlins coaches
Montreal Expos coaches
Toronto Blue Jays coaches
Houston Astros coaches
Major League Baseball pitching coaches
Merced College alumni
Alaska Goldpanners of Fairbanks players